Sunda is a municipality in the Faroe Islands, loosely centered around the Sundini sound between the islands of Streymoy and Eysturoy.

History
Sunda is an amalgamation of the former municipalities of Hósvíkar, Hvalvíkar, Saksunar, Haldarsvíkar, (former) Sunda and Gjáar kommuna, which merged in 2005. The mayor as of 2020 is Heðin Zachariasen, who was also the first mayor, from 2005 to 2009.

Geography
The region in which Sunda kommuna is situated is referred to as Sundalagið, centered around the Sundini (The Narrows) between the islands of Streymoy and Eysturoy. The region also includes Eiðis kommuna, while strictly speaking Gjógv does not belong to Sundalagið, though is part of Sunda kommuna. The villages Selatrað, Morskranes and Kolbeinagjógv are also situated on the Sundini but not considered part of Sundalagið region.

Sunda kommuna contains the following villages:
Hósvík
Norðskáli
Hvalvík
Streymnes
Haldórsvík
Oyri
Oyrarbakki
Tjørnuvík
Gjógv
Langasandur
Saksun
Nesvík

The municipality is centrally located in the country, situated in the middle of highway 10 between capital Tórshavn and second city Klaksvík. Both cities are 40 kilometers by road from Oyrarbakki. The eastern and western bank of Sundini are connected by the Streymin Bridge. This is the only road link between these islands until the Eysturoyartunnilin has finished and opened in 2021. National bus service 400 connects Tórshavn, Oyrarbakki and Klaksvík up to 11 times on weekdays in either direction, with less frequent routes to Tjørnuvík, Eiði and Gjógv operating from Oyrarbakki weekdays-only. How Sunda will be connected to Tórshavn and Klaksvík by public transport in the future, when the Eysturoyartunnilin has rearranged route 400, remains unknown. A free citizen-only bus service operated by Sunda kommuna connects all villages except Saksun and Gjógv.

Population
As of January 2020, there were 1,811 inhabitants. The population is steadily rising, up from 1.386 in 2000. The Sundalagið as a whole (including Eiðis kommuna and Gjógv) had 2,572 inhabitants in 2020. The area is popular for its central location in the country, at commuting distance from all major towns.

Photos

References

External links 
 Website of Sunda kommuna

Municipalities of the Faroe Islands
Streymoy
Eysturoy